Prociphilus tessellatus, known generally as the woolly alder aphid or maple blight aphid, is a species of aphid in the family Aphididae.

References

Aphids
Insects described in 1851